The Thomas J. Dodd Prize in International Justice and Human Rights is awarded biennially by the University of Connecticut to an individual or group who has made a significant effort to advance the cause of international justice and global human rights.

The Dodd Prize commemorates the distinguished career in public service of Thomas J. Dodd who, as Executive Trial Counsel at the Nuremberg Trials and a Connecticut Senator from 1959 to 1971, fought against infringement and suppression of human rights in the United States and abroad.

The prize carries an award of $75,000, a diploma, and a commemorative bronze bust of Thomas J. Dodd.

Prize recipients 
The Prize winners, per the Thomas J. Dodd Research Center:
 2003: Taoiseach Bertie Ahern, T.D., Prime Minister of Ireland and the Right Honourable Tony Blair
 2005: Former United Nations High Commissioner for Human Rights Louise Arbour and South African Justice Richard Goldstone
 2007: Center for Justice and Accountability and Mental Disability Rights International
 2009: Committee to Protect Journalists
 2011: Center for Justice and International Law (CEJIL)
 2013: Business and Human Rights Resource Centre
 2015: Tostan and Bill Clinton
 2017: Physicians for Human Rights
 2019: Both Bryan Stevenson and the Equal Justice Initiative he founded in 1989

References

External links
 Thomas J. Dodd Prize In International Justice And Human Rights

Human rights awards
Awards established in 2003
University of Connecticut
Dodd family